Baitang is a town of Hanjiang District, Putian, midway along the Taiwan Strait coast of Fujian province, China. , it has 16 villages under its administration.

See also 
 List of township-level divisions of Fujian

References 

Township-level divisions of Fujian